The Roman Catholic Diocese of Chiquinquirá is a diocese located in the city of Chiquinquirá in the Ecclesiastical province of Tunja in Colombia.

History
26 April 1977: Established as Diocese of Chiquinquirá from the Metropolitan Archdiocese of Tunja

Ordinaries
Alberto Giraldo Jaramillo, P.S.S. (26 Apr 1977 – 26 Jul 1983) Appointed, Bishop of Cúcuta
Alvaro Raúl Jarro Tobos † (19 Jun 1984 – 24 Jun 1997) Appointed, Bishop of Colombia, Military
Héctor Luis Gutiérrez Pabón (2 Feb 1998 – 6 Aug 2003) Appointed, Bishop of Engativá
Luis Felipe Sánchez Aponte (11 Feb 2004 – present)

See also
Roman Catholicism in Colombia

Sources

External links
 GCatholic.org

Roman Catholic dioceses in Colombia
Roman Catholic Ecclesiastical Province of Tunja
Christian organizations established in 1977
Roman Catholic dioceses and prelatures established in the 20th century
1977 establishments in Colombia